The 2nd Infantry Brigade Combat Team, 34th Infantry Division is an Iowa Army National Guard unit headquartered in Boone, Iowa.

History

The history of the 2nd Brigade Headquarters began in June, 1924 with the activation in Boone of Headquarters Battery and Combat Train, 2nd Battalion, 185th Field Artillery, a unit of the 34th Infantry Division.

In July, 1940 the unit was reorganized as Headquarters Battery, 2nd Battalion, 185th Field Artillery.  In December, 1940 the unit was again reorganized, this time as Battery F, 185th Field Artillery.  In February, 1941 Battery F was federalized for World War II, this time as Battery C, 185th Field Artillery.  The 185th Field Artillery served in the North African and Italian campaigns as part of the 34th Infantry Division.

Battery C returned from World War II service in November, 1945.  In January, 1947 it was reorganized as Headquarters Battery, 185th Field Artillery.

In 1959 Headquarters Battery was reconfigured as Headquarters Battery, 4th Battalion (Rocket Howitzer), 185th Field Artillery.  In 1963 another reorganization resulted in the unit’s designation as Headquarters Battery, 4th Battalion (Howitzer), 185th Field Artillery.

Headquarters Battery went through consolidation and reorganization in 1968 and became Headquarters and Headquarters Company, 34th Brigade, 47th Infantry Division.
In February, 1991 the 47th Division was inactivated, and 34th Brigade was re-designated as 2nd Brigade, 34th Infantry Division.

Honors
Algeria-French Morocco (World War II)

Recent events

Prior to 2005, 2nd Brigade was organized as an Air Assault Brigade.  In that configuration it consisted of three infantry battalions including 2nd Battalion, 135th Infantry in Minnesota.  In addition, 1st Battalion, 194th Field Artillery, the 334th Forward Support Battalion and an Engineer company were part of 2nd Brigade’s direct support.

After the September 11, 2001 terrorist attacks individuals and units from 2nd Brigade deployed as part of the Global War on Terrorism, including Operations Noble Eagle, Iraqi Freedom, Enduring Freedom, and New Dawn.

When 2nd Brigade was reorganized as a modular infantry brigade combat team (IBCT) in 2005, 1st Battalion, 194th Field Artillery and the reorganized 334th Brigade Support Battalion became part of the brigade’s task organization.  The change to an IBCT also included removing 2nd Battalion, 135th Infantry from the task organization and adding 1st Squadron, 113th Cavalry.

2nd Brigade has continued its Air Assault tradition.  In 2010 and 2011 the 2nd Brigade served in Afghanistan.  During this deployment the organization conducted "Operation Bull Whip," a successful Air Assault mission in Laghman Province.

Structure 
As of 2016, 2nd BCT’s task organization includes:

 Headquarters, 2nd Infantry Brigade Combat Team, 34th ID (Iowa National Guard (IA ARNG))
Headquarters and Headquarters Company (HHC) 2nd Infantry Brigade Combat Team
 1st Squadron, 113th Cavalry Regiment Reconnaissance Surveillance and Target Acquisition (RSTA) (IA NG)
 1st Battalion, 133rd Infantry Regiment (IA NG)
 2nd Battalion, 135th Infantry Regiment
 1st Battalion, 168th Infantry Regiment (IA NG)
 1st Battalion, 194th Field Artillery Regiment (1-194th FAR) 
 224th Brigade Engineer Battalion (224th BEB) 
 334th Brigade Support Battalion (334th BSB)

References

Infantry 034 02
Infantry 034 02
2